Leslie Renfrey (15 February 1893 – 23 September 1958) was an Australian cricketer. He played ten first-class matches for Western Australia between 1922/23 and 1927/28.

See also
 List of Western Australia first-class cricketers

References

External links
 

1893 births
1958 deaths
Australian cricketers
Western Australia cricketers